The World Taekwondo Gala Awards are an annual award ceremony hosted by World Taekwondo. The first edition was on 5 December 2014 in Querétaro, Mexico.

Ceremonies 
The ceremonies are typically held one day after the annual Grand Prix final and hosted in the same city.

Winners

Player of the Year

Kick of the Year

Fair Play Award

Coach of the Year

Member National Association (MNA) of the Year

Referee of the Year

National Team of the Year

Best Continental Union of the Year

Most Improved MNA of the Year

References

World Taekwondo
Sports trophies and awards